Elachista rufocinerea is a moth of the family Elachistidae found in Europe.

The head is whitish. Forewings white, in male densely irrorated with brown, in female more. thinly with ochreous. Hindwings in male dark grey, in female grey.

The moth flies from April to May depending on the location.

The larvae feed on various grasses, primarily, false oat-grass (Arrhenatherum elatius), tall fescue (Festuca arundinacea) and creeping soft grass (Holcus mollis). The mine is flat and translucent and can run either up or down. They are dirty yellow, but grey green above. The head is brown. Larvae can be found in early spring.

References

External links
 Lepidoptera of Belgium
 bladmineerders.nl

rufocinerea
Leaf miners
Moths described in 1828
Moths of Europe
Taxa named by Adrian Hardy Haworth